Umm al-Darda al-Kubra (Arabic: أم الدرداء الكبرى) was a companion of prophet Muhammad. She was a prominent jurist during the 7th century in Damascus.

One of her students, ʿAbd al-Malik ibn Marwān, was the 5th Umayyad caliph. He studied fiqh under Umm al-Darda The 14th-century Muslim historian Ibn Khaldun states, "ʿAbd al-Malik ibn Marwan is one of the greatest Arab and Muslim Caliphs. He followed in the footsteps of ʿUmar ibn al-Khattab, the Commander of the Believers, in regulating state affairs."

See also
Hafsa bint Sirin
Umm al-Darda as-Sughra

References

7th-century Arabs
Women companions of the Prophet
People from Damascus
Syrian Muslims
Syrian women